Rahdarkhaneh may refer to:
 Rahdarkhaneh, Gilan